Anoop Kumar is an Indian actor who has appeared in Tamil language films. He made his debut in the 2006 film, Vattaram directed by Saran.

Career
Anoop is the grandson of Telugu film director V. Madhusudhana Rao. Director Saran launched Anoop in Vattaram, where he played a character role in love with Vasundhara Kashyap's character. Thereafter, Anoop produced a film, Kathi Kappal, in which he played the lead role. The film, which featured him alongside Meera Vasudevan, won poor reviews with a critic noting "after a point, his scruffy face makes you want to shake him out of misery." He then signed on to play a role in Keka, a Telugu film and then also appeared in a second lead role in Chikku Bukku with Arya and Shriya Saran.

In 2014, Marumugam, he will be seen alongside Daniel Balaji.

Filmography
All films are in Tamil, unless otherwise noted.

References

Indian male film actors
Male actors in Tamil cinema
Living people
Male actors from Chennai
Year of birth missing (living people)